Josvainiai (formerly) is a small town in Kėdainiai district, central Lithuania. It is located on the Šušvė River 10 km southwest from Kėdainiai. In the town there is a Catholic All Saints Church, gymnasium, post office and public library, stud farm, culture house.

History 
The toponym Josvainiai probably derives from the unattested Lithuanian personal name *Josvainis.

Historians believe that there was a medieval castle in Josvainiai, and it was attacked by the Teutonic Knights many times. In 1486 Josvainiai was mentioned as a town. During the 16th century the royal manor of Josvainiai and the first wooden church were mentioned. During the wars of the 16th–17th centuries Josvainiai castle was devastated by Swedes. 

The town was granted city rights and coat of arms on March 29, 1792. On July 19, 2006, the town was granted renewed coat of arms by a presidential decree.

During the Soviet era Josvainiai was a center of a selsovet and kolkhoz.

Jewish community 
Jews first settled in Josvainiai in the 17th century. By 1897, 534 Jews lived in the town, constituting 40% of the total population. There was a synagogue and a Jewish school. Most Jews were expelled during World War I. During their absence, a large portion of the town burned down. After the War, some returned. Before The Holocaust, the Jewish population was 270 and included about 70 families. They lived around the marketplace and the nearby streets. During World War II, 282 Jews were murdered in a mass execution: 86 men, 110 women, and 86 children.

Demography

Images

References

Kėdainiai District Municipality
Towns in Kaunas County